The Shooting competition in the 2009 Asian Youth Games was held at SAFRA Yishun Country Club in Singapore between 1 July and 4 July 2009.

Medalists

Boys

Girls

Medal table

Results

Boys

10 m air pistol
4 July

10 m air rifle
2 July

Girls

10 m air pistol
3 July

10 m air rifle
1 July

References
 Official site
 Asian Shooting Confederation

2009 Asian Youth Games events
A